Graeme Jose (21 November 1951 – 23 June 1973) was an Australian cyclist. He competed in the individual road race and team time trial events at the 1972 Summer Olympics. On 23 June 1973, while taking part in a race in Feldkirch, Austria, he ran into the rear of a parked tray topped lorry and was killed.

References

External links
 

1951 births
1973 deaths
Australian male cyclists
Olympic cyclists of Australia
Cyclists at the 1972 Summer Olympics
People from Whyalla
Cyclists who died while racing
Sport deaths in Austria